Karma Ghale (31 January 1964 – 7 February 2023) was a Nepali politician who was a member of the House of Representatives of the federal parliament of Nepal. He was elected under the proportional representation system from Nepali Congress, filling the reserved seat for indigenous groups. He was also a member of the Women and Social Welfare Committee of the House. In the parliamentary shadow cabinet of Nepali Congress, the main opposition party, he was a member of the Ministry of Industry, Commerce and Supplies.

Ghale died from prostate cancer on 7 February 2023, at the age of 59.

References

1964 births
2023 deaths 
Deaths from prostate cancer
Place of birth missing 
Place of death missing
Nepal MPs 2017–2022
Nepali Congress politicians from Gandaki Province